Rambabu Prasai, a.k.a. Khanuparude, is a Nepalese politician. He's the president of the Nepali Congress (Rastrabadi), a splinter group of the Nepali Congress. Khanuparude had been the treasurer of the Nepali Congress and its candidate in the Jhapa-2 constituency in the 1994 election.

References

Living people
Nepali Congress (Rastrabadi) politicians
Nepali Congress politicians from Koshi Province
Year of birth missing (living people)